The DVF Awards, supported by The Diller-von Furstenberg Family Foundation, are given annually to provide recipients with the exposure and resources necessary to extend their efforts on behalf of women all over the world. The DVF Awards were conceived by Diane von Furstenberg in 2010 with the goal of honoring women who have displayed leadership, strength, and courage in their commitment to their causes. Every year, each Honoree receives a $50,000 grant from the Foundation to further their work. The inaugural DVF Awards were presented on March 13, 2010 at a ceremony hosted by Diane von Fürstenberg and Tina Brown at the United Nations on the closing night of The Women in the World Summit.
Each year, two DVF Awards are given to women within The Vital Voices Global Partnership. In addition, the Inspiration Award is given to a woman who has demonstrated strength and courage in the face of adversity, and is using her experience and influence to effect positive change. The People's Voice Award is also given annually to a woman chosen from a field of nominees selected by The DVF Awards Board of Advisors and voted on by the public at DVFAwards.com. The Lifetime Leadership Award honors an individual who has dedicated her life and body of work to instilling in other women the courage to fight, the power to survive and the leadership to inspire. Past recipients include U.S. Supreme Court Justice Ruth Bader Ginsburg, Gloria Steinem, Ingrid Betancourt, Hillary Clinton, Oprah Winfrey and Robin Roberts. 
 
Presenters at The DVF Awards have included Meryl Streep, Iman, Olivia Wilde, Jessica Alba, Deborah Winger, Gabby Douglas, and Chelsea Clinton.

2022 Honorees
The following are the honorees for 2022:

 The International Award: Zoya Lytvyn
 The International Award: Hindou Oumarou Ibrahim
 The International Award: Women of Afghanistan
 The Inspiration Award: Ava DuVernay
 The Lifetime Leadership Award: Christine Lagarde

2021 Honorees
The following are the honorees for 2021:

The International Award: Dr. Rouba Mhaissen
 The International Award: Wai Wai Nu
 The Inspiration Award: Clarissa Ward
 The Lifetime Leadership Award: Melinda French Gates 
The DVF Award: Vanessa Nakate

2020 Honorees
The following are the honorees for 2020:

 The International Award: Priti Patkar, Prerana
 The International Award: Saskia Nino de Rivera, Reinserta
 The Inspiration Award: Iman
 The Lifetime Leadership Award: U.S. Supreme Court Justice Ruth Bader Ginsburg

2019 Honorees
The following are the honorees for 2019:

 The International Award: Nadia Murad, Nadia's Initiative
 The International Award: Hadeel Mustafa Anabtawi, The Alchemist Lab
 The People's Voice Award: Susan Burton, A New Way Of Life Reentry Project
 The Inspiration Award: Katy Perry
 The Lifetime Leadership Award: Anita F. Hill

2018 Honorees
The following are the honorees for 2018:

 The International Award: Jaha Dukureh, Safe Hands For Girls
 The International Award: Ariela Suster, Sequence Collection
 The People's Voice Award: Luma Mufleh, Fugees Family, Inc.
 The Inspiration Award: Misty Copeland
 The Lifetime Leadership Award: U.S. Supreme Court Justice Sonia Sotomayor

2017 Honorees
The following are the honorees for 2017:
The International Award: Yoani Sánchez, 14ymedio
The International Award: Baljeet Sandhu, Migrant & Refugee Children's Legal Unit (MiCLU)
The People's Voice Award: Louise Dubé, iCivics
The Inspiration Award: Karlie Kloss, Kode With Klossy
The Lifetime Leadership Award: Dr. Jane Goodall, The Jane Goodall Institute (JGI)

2016 Honorees
The following are the honorees for 2016:
 The International Award: Maria Pacheco, Wakami
 The International Award: Agnes Igoye, Huts for Peace
 The People's Voice Award: Emily Greener, I AM THAT GIRL
 The Inspiration Award: Sarah Jones, Girls Educational and Mentoring Services', The Legal Aid Society and Sanctuary for Families
 The Lifetime Leadership Award: Dr. Martine Rothblatt, Los Angeles LGBT Center and The Astraea Lesbian Foundation for Justice

2015 Honorees
The following are the honorees for 2015:
 The International Award: Adimaimalaga Tafuna’i, Women In Business
 The International Award: Samar Minallah Khan, Ethnomedia
 The People's Voice Award: Becky Straw and Jody Landers, The Adventure Project
 The Inspiration Award: Gabby Giffords, Americans for Responsible Solutions
 The Lifetime Leadership Award: Melanne Verveer, The Georgetown Institute for Women, Peace and Security at Georgetown University

2014 Honorees
The following are the honorees for 2014:
 The DVF Award: Kah Walla, STRATEGIES!
 The DVF Award: Liron Peleg-Hadomi & Noha Khatieb
 The People's Voice Award: Veronika Scott, The Empowerment Plan
 The Inspiration Award: Alicia Keys, Keep a Child Alive
 The Lifetime Leadership Award: Gloria Steinem, Equality Now and Donor Direct Action

2013 Honorees
The following are the honorees for 2013:
 The DVF Award: Sunitha Krishnan, Prajwala
 The DVF Award: Andeisha Farid, Afghan Child Education and Caring Organization (AFCECO).
 The People's Voice Award: Tammy Tibbetts, She's the First
 The Inspiration Award: Natalia Vodianova, Naked Heart Foundation
 The Lifetime Leadership Award: Robin Roberts, Be the Match

2012 Honorees
The following are the honorees for 2012:
 The DVF Award: Panmela Castro, Rede Nami
 The DVF Award: Chouchou Namegabe, South Kivu's Association of Women Journalists
 The People's Voice Award: Layli Miller-Muro, Tahirih Justice Center
 The Inspiration Award: Jaycee Dugard, The JAYC Foundation
 The Lifetime Leadership Award: Oprah Winfrey, The Oprah Winfrey Leadership Academy Foundation

2011 Honorees
The following are the honorees for 2011:
 The DVF Award: Sohini Chakraborty, Kolkata Sanved
 The DVF Award: Kakenya Ntaiya, Kakenya Center for Excellence
 The People's Voice Award: Taryn Davis, The American Widow Project
 The Inspiration Award: Elizabeth Smart, Elizabeth Smart Foundation
 The Lifetime Leadership Award: Secretary of State Hillary Clinton

2010 Honorees
The following are the honorees for 2010:
 The DVF Award: Danielle Saint-Lot, Femmes en Démocratie
 The DVF Award: Sadiqa Basiri Saleem, The Oruj Learning Center
 The People's Voice Award: Katherine Chon, The Polaris Project 
 The Lifetime Leadership Award: Ingrid Betancourt, The Ingrid Betancourt Foundation

See also

 List of awards honoring women

References 

DVF